The Vanderbilt Commodores men's soccer represented Vanderbilt University in NCAA Division I men's college soccer competitions. The Commodores played as an associate member of the Missouri Valley Conference through 2005.

The program was dropped in 2006. The college cited Title IX as the reason for its decision. However, supporters of the team and some experts on the legislation say this was not necessary.

Record by season

References

External links 
 Vanderbilt Athletics Site

 
1977 establishments in Tennessee
2006 disestablishments in Tennessee
Association football clubs disestablished in 2006
Defunct soccer clubs in Tennessee
Association football clubs established in 1977